John Manley (born 1950) is a Canadian politician

John Manley may also refer to:

John Manley (MP) (1622–1699), English soldier, MP and Postmaster General
John Manley (archaeologist) (born 1950), British archaeologist
John Henry Manley (1907–1990), American nuclear physicist
John Manley (naval officer) (1733–1793), United States Navy officer